Shalom Dutey (born 20 April 1998) is a Togolese professional footballer who plays as a defender for Charlotte Independence in the USL Championship.

Career

Youth, College & Amateur
Dutey played youth football with the One7 Academy, before heading to Liberty University in 2016 to play in college. Over four seasons with the Flames, Dutey made 55 appearances and scored 2 goals.

Whilst at college, Dutey also played in the USL League Two with Tri-Cities Otters and Charlotte Eagles.

Professional
Dutey signed his first professional contract with USL Championship side Charlotte Independence ahead of their 2020 season. Dutey didn't appear in 2020, but re-signed with the club on 14 April 2021. He made his professional debut on 1 May 2021, appearing as an 88th-minute substitute during a 3–0 loss to Tampa Bay Rowdies.

References

External links
 
 Shalom Dutey at Liberty University Athletics

1998 births
Living people
Togolese footballers
Togolese expatriate footballers
American soccer players
Association football defenders
Liberty Flames men's soccer players
Charlotte Eagles players
Charlotte Independence players
Soccer players from Charlotte, North Carolina
USL League Two players
USL Championship players
USL League One players
21st-century Togolese people